Marius Eugen Tobă (born 9 January 1968) is a retired Romanian-born German artistic gymnast, who competed for Romania at the 1988 Olympics and for Germany at the 1996 and 2000 Games. His best individual result  in an olympics or worlds was sixth place on rings in 2000. At the European championships he won two medals for Germany in 1994–1996. He is the 1988 Gold medalist in the All Around at the American Cup.

Tobă never considered himself a brilliant gymnast, but was known for his consistency and reliability. He has a daughter Sabrina and son Andreas Toba from his past marriage, which ended in divorce in 2006. Andreas also took up gymnastics, coached by his father, and competed at the 2012 and 2016 Olympics.

References

1968 births
Living people
Gymnasts at the 1988 Summer Olympics
Gymnasts at the 1996 Summer Olympics
Gymnasts at the 2000 Summer Olympics
Olympic gymnasts of Romania
Olympic gymnasts of Germany
Romanian male artistic gymnasts
German male artistic gymnasts
German people of Romanian descent
Sportspeople from Reșița